A facial prosthetic or facial prosthesis is an artificial device used to change or adapt the outward appearance of a person's face or head.

When used in the theatre, film or television industry, facial prosthetic makeup alters a person's normal face into something extraordinary. Facial prosthetics can be made from a wide range of materials - including gelatin, foam latex, silicone, and cold foam. Effects can be as subtle as altering the curve of a cheek or nose, or making someone appear older or younger than they are. A facial prosthesis can also transform an actor into any creature, such as legendary creatures, animals and others.

To apply facial prosthetics, Pros-Aide, Beta Bond, Medical Adhesive or Liquid Latex is generally used. Pros-Aide is a water-based adhesive that has been the "industry standard" for over 30 years. It's completely waterproof and is formulated for use with sensitive skin. It is easily removed with Pros-Aide Remover. BetaBond is growing in popularity among Hollywood artists who say it's easier to remove. Medical Adhesive has the advantage that it's specifically designed not to cause allergies or skin irritation. Liquid Latex can only be used for a few hours, but can be used to create realistic blends from skin to prosthetics.

After application, cosmetics and/or paint is used to color the prosthetics and skin the desired colors, and achieve a realistic transition from skin to prosthetic. This can be done by the wearer, but is often done by a separate, trained artist.

At the end of its use, some prosthetics can be removed simply by being pulled off. Others need special solvents to help remove the prosthetics, such as Pros-Aide Remover (water based and completely safe) for Pros-Aide, Beta Solv for Beta Bond, and medical adhesive remover for medical adhesive.

Prosthetic make-up is becoming increasingly popular for everyday use. This kind of make-up is used by people who wish to significantly alter their features.

History of Facial Prosthetic

The Emergence in Ancient History 
It began not after antiquity where the face was worn with artificial parts despite the lack of proof in the theory. It has been found that archaeologists stumbled upon an artefact that was false inside a skull’s left eye socket in Iran that goes way back around 3000-2900 B.C. Traces of thread were seen on the eye socket. When the person of the head skull died, the false eye was inserted. Gold masks were found on mummies in Ancient Egypt tombs around 2500 B.C., cosmetic gold and silver coins were present. The revelation of these findings are the start of the knowledge of the skill of facial prosthetics and in the ancient times focused on the social priority of the face. Body parts such as noses, ears and hands were a way as punishment for adultery in Ancient India. In the Vedic era, a well-known disquisition on the Indian treatments named The Sushruta Samhita, had done a report of the nasal pyramid with a cutaneous flap had been taken from the frontal region which shows signs of surgical reconstruction. The luck of it succeeding was not as high compared to these days. Hence, showing theories on prosthetic reconstructions attempts in history that are possibly not reported. 

In 1810 - 1750 B.C. Mesopotamia, it was found that punitive mutilations by the King Hammurabi were done despite his medical and morality being recognised. The people that had mutilated others had been retaliated by punishment which had restored lost parts which encouraged a few attempts at surgical grafting. There was barely any mention of facial prosthesis in the writings of the Greco-Roman Period. Long bone fracture reductions and restraints were more interesting to Hippocrates, Gallen and Celse than the treatment in maxillofacial defects.

Facial Prostheses of the Kings in Post-Classical History 
The Byzantine in the Middle Ages believed that an individual would not be able to have been an Emperor also known as a ‘Rhinokopia’ if they had a severed nose. An order by Leonce was made to mutilate a nose belonging to the Emperor Justinian (482 - 565). History was made when Otton III (980 - 1002) who was the Emperor of the Holy Empire visited in 1000 A.D. to the tomb of Charlemagne at Aix-La-Chapelle in France. A tooth of Charlemagne was removed by Otton as a relic and a gold plate became a replacement to a piece of the cadaver’s broken nose.  

During that time as well, ivory made facial prostheses were described by Abulcasis (936 - 1013).

The Birth of Maxillofacial Prosthetics in Modern History (Early Modern Period) 
Ambroise Paré (1510 - 1590) founded maxillofacial prosthetics who had the clinical knowledge tinged with medicine in the military which gave the first maxillofacial prosthesis with surgical  anchorage. After three years had passed using human dissections to get educated on human anatomy, despite being previously known from the biggest hospital in the kingdom of France, the Hôtel-Dieu in Paris, he made the decision to relocate to Vitré to obtain knowledge of surgery from a barber. He proceeded to practice in heavy mutilations as a military surgeon prior to being assigned as “Surgeon of The King” of France (for Henri II and Charles IX).

Materials and Techniques for Facial Prosthesis in Modern History (Late Modern Period) 
In the 19th Century throughout the time of the industrial revolution, appearance was improved a great deal by recently developed materials accessible for facial prostheses. Silver and gold were exchanged with lighter materials as they gave discomfort to the face and were stiff. To mask disfigurement, epitheses were used as it was practical and more successful therapeutics. In fact, in 1851, sulphur was incorporated into rubber which made Goodyear acquire vulcanite. It turned out to be a vital component of conventional dental prosthesis and facial prosthesis. A trouble-free and colourable creation being able to be used in both hard and soft structures.  

The application of vulcanite for facial prostheses was also mentioned by Norman Kingsley (1829 - 1931) and Apoléoni Preterre (1821-1893) in 1864 and 1866, respectively. In 1879, celluloid was used by Kingsley. Maxillofacial prosthetics were given a new dimension by mixing maxillofacial surgery with dental prosthetics by a French physician and dentist, Claude Martin (1843 - 1911) by the end of the 19th century. “Surgical” and “prosthesis” were terms used in conjunction with each other by Martin for the first time in De la prothèse immédiate à la résection des maxillaires. He had explained that in giving fulfilling skin simulation, the use of translucent ceramics for nasal prosthesis after amputation is the key.

Problems
Being exposed to high temperatures can cause problems when wearing prosthetics. Glues that were sturdy at normal temperatures can become less effective under heat. This could lead to prosthetics falling apart or peeling from the skin.

Higher temperatures can cause sweating which can also affect the durability of the prosthetics. The negative effects of sweating can be prevented by cleaning the skin well with 99% alcohol before applying the adhesive. Another way to ensure that the facial prosthetics stay on once they have been applied is to treat the skin with an anti-perspirant beforehand.

See also
 Angellift
 Lifecasting
 Prosthesis
 Prosthetic makeup

References

Cosmetics
Prosthetics
Prosthetic